Salimicrobium flavidum is a Gram-variable and motile bacterium from the genus of Salimicrobium which has been isolated from sediments of a marine solar saltern from the Yellow Sea in Korea.

References

 

Bacillaceae
Bacteria described in 2009